

Traditional regions 

There are also other regions in Slovakia, which do not correspond to historical counties:

See also 
 List of counties of the Kingdom of Hungary located in Slovakia
 Regions of Slovakia
 List of tourism regions of Slovakia

Regions, traditional